Radom Voivodeship was a unit of administrative division and local government in Poland in the years 1975–1998, superseded by Masovian Voivodeship. Its capital city was Radom.

Major cities and towns (population in 1995)
 Radom (232,300)
 Pionki (22,100)
 Kozienice (21,500)

See also
 Voivodeship
 Voivodeships of Poland

Former voivodeships of Poland (1975–1998)
Radom
History of Lesser Poland Voivodeship
History of Łódź Voivodeship
History of Świętokrzyskie Voivodeship